WNML may refer to:

 WNML (AM), a radio station (990 AM) licensed to serve Knoxville, Tennessee, United States
 WNML-FM, a radio station (99.1 FM) licensed to serve Friendsville, Tennessee